Armen Manucharyan (born 3 February 1995) is an Armenian international footballer who plays as a right back, for Van.

Club career
Born in Yerevan, he has played club football for Banants and Pyunik.

On 10 August 2020, he signed with Russian Premier League club FC Rotor Volgograd.

On 27 February 2021, Manucharyan joined Aktobe in Kazakhstan. On 23 June 2021, after 11 games for Aktobe, Manucharyan left the club by mutual consent.

On 18 August 2021, Manucharyan returned to the Armenian Premier League, signing for Urartu. On 2 June 2022 Manucharyan left Urartu by mutual termination of his contract.

On 15 February 2023, Van announced the signing of Manucharyan.

International career
He made his international debut for Armenia in 2017.

Career statistics

Club

International

References

1995 births
Living people
Footballers from Yerevan
Armenian footballers
Armenia international footballers
Association football fullbacks
Armenian Premier League players
Russian Premier League players
FC Urartu players
FC Pyunik players
FC Rotor Volgograd players
FC Aktobe players
Armenian expatriate footballers
Expatriate footballers in Russia
Expatriate footballers in Kazakhstan
Armenian expatriates in Russia
Armenian expatriate sportspeople in Kazakhstan
FC Van players